Comic Media was a short-lived comic book company owned by Allen Hardy that existed in the 1950s. Its titles were mainly action/adventure, western, and horror. Its most notable character was Johnny Dynamite, created by Pete Morisi. The main artist across its titles was Don Heck, who in 1955 would be recruited by Stan Lee to Atlas Comics; what would become Marvel Comics. Heck went on to be one of the architects of what became known as "The Marvel Age of Comics," along with Jack Kirby, Steve Ditko, and Dick Ayers. While there Heck co-created Iron Man, Hawkeye, and Black Widow.

When Comic Media became defunct, the company sold its titles and characters to Charlton Comics. Charlton then continued Dynamite as Johnny Dynamite, with work by Morisi, who continued to work for the company for many years. Johnny Dynamite would later be purchased by Max Allan Collins and Terry Beatty and reprinted in their Ms. Tree title and a limited series they created.

Notable titles
 3D Funny Movies (1 issue, 1953) (humor)
 All True Romance (20 issues, 1951–54) (romance) — acquired by Farrell Publications
 Confessions of Love (2 issues, 1950) (romance)
 Danger (11 issues, 1953–53) (espionage)
 Dear Lonely Heart (8 issues, 1951–52) (romance)
 Dear Lonely Hearts (8 issues, 1953–54) (romance)
 Death Valley (6 issues, 1953–54) (western)
 Dynamite (9 issues, 1953–54) (action, Johnny Dynamite in issue #3 on)
 Honeymoon Romance (2 issues, 1950) (romance)
 Horrific (13 issues, 1952–54) (horror)
 Noodnick (5 issues, 1953–54) (romance)
 Terrific (1 issues, 1954) (horror) (numbering continues from Horrific (Comic Media, 1952 series) #14
 War Fury (4 issues, 1952–53) (War)
 Weird Terror (13 issues, 1952–54) (horror)

References

External links 
 
 

Comic book publishing companies of the United States
Defunct comics and manga publishing companies
1952 establishments in the United States
Publishing companies established in 1952